KBGV (1240 AM, "Classic Hit Country") is a radio station broadcasting a country music format. Licensed to Monte Vista, Colorado, United States, the station is currently owned by San Luis Valley Broadcasting and features programming from AP Radio and Dial Global.

Previous logo

References

External links
 

Country radio stations in the United States
BGV
Radio stations established in 1954
1954 establishments in Colorado